Walter John de la Mare  (25 April 1873 – 22 June 1956) was an English poet, short story writer and novelist. He is probably best remembered for his works for children, for his poem "The Listeners", and for his psychological horror stories, among them "Seaton's Aunt" and "All Hallows".

In  1921 his novel Memoirs of a Midget won the James Tait Black Memorial Prize for fiction, and his post-war Collected Stories for Children won the 1947 Carnegie Medal for British children's books.

Life

De la Mare was born at 83, Maryon Road, Charlton, then in the county of Kent but now part of the Royal Borough of Greenwich. He was partly descended from a family of French Huguenot silk merchants through his father, James Edward de la Mare (1811–1877), a principal at the Bank of England; his mother was James's second wife, Lucy Sophia (1838–1920), daughter of a Scottish naval surgeon and author, Dr Colin Arrott Browning. (The suggestion that Lucy was related to the poet Robert Browning has been found to be incorrect.) He had two brothers, Francis Arthur Edward and James Herbert, and four sisters, Florence Mary, Constance Eliza, Ethel (who died in infancy) and Ada Mary. De la Mare preferred to be known as "Jack" to his family and friends, as he disliked the name Walter. 

De la Mare was educated at St Paul's Cathedral School, then worked from 1890 to 1908 in the statistics department of the London office of Standard Oil for eighteen years. He left the company after Sir Henry Newbolt arranged for him to receive a Civil List pension so that he could concentrate on writing.

In 1892 de la Mare joined the Esperanza Amateur Dramatics Club, where he met and fell in love with (Constance) Elfrida Ingpen, the leading lady, who was ten years older than him. Her father, William Alfred Ingpen, was Clerk to the Insolvent Debtors Court and Clerk of the Rules. De la Mare and Elfrida were married on 4 August 1899, and they went on to have four children: Richard Herbert Ingpen, Colin, Florence and Lucy Elfrida. The family lived in Beckenham and Anerley from 1899 till 1924. The home in Anerley in South London was the scene of many parties, notable for imaginative games of charades. From 1925 to 1939, de la Mare lived at Hill House, Taplow.

In 1940 Elfrida de la Mare was diagnosed with Parkinson's disease. She spent the rest of her life as an invalid and died in 1943. 

From 1940 until his death de la Mare lived in South End House, Montpelier Row, Twickenham, on the same street on which Alfred, Lord Tennyson, had lived. De la Mare won the annual Carnegie Medal, from the Library Association, recognising the year's best children's book by a British subject, for his Collected Stories for Children (Faber and Faber, 1947). It was the first collection to win the award.

De la Mare suffered from a coronary thrombosis in 1947 and died of another in 1956. He spent his final year mostly bedridden, being cared for by a nurse whom he loved but never had a physical relationship with. His ashes are buried in the crypt of St Paul's Cathedral, where he had once been a choirboy.

Imagination

De la Mare described two distinct "types" of imagination – although "aspects" might be a better term: the childlike and the boylike. It was at the border between the two that Shakespeare, Dante, and the rest of the great poets lay.

De la Mare claimed that all children fall into the category of having a childlike imagination at first, which is usually replaced at some point in their lives. He explained in the lecture "Rupert Brooke and the Intellectual Imagination" that children "are not bound in by their groping senses. Facts to them are the liveliest of chameleons. ... They are contemplatives, solitaries, fakirs, who sink again and again out of the noise and fever of existence and into a waking vision."  His biographer Doris Ross McCrosson summarises this passage, "Children are, in short, visionaries." This visionary view of life can be seen as either vital creativity and ingenuity, or fatal disconnection from reality (or, in a limited sense, both).

The increasing intrusions of the external world upon the mind, however, frighten the childlike imagination, which "retires like a shocked snail into its shell". From then onward the boyish imagination flourishes, the "intellectual, analytical type".

By adulthood (de la Mare proposed), the childlike imagination has either retreated for ever or grown bold enough to face the real world. Thus emerge the two extremes of the spectrum of adult minds: the mind moulded by the boylike is "logical" and "deductive". That shaped by the childlike becomes "intuitive, inductive". For de la Mare, "The one knows that beauty is truth, the other reveals that truth is beauty." Yet another way he puts it is that the visionary's source of poetry is within, while the intellectual's sources are without – external – in "action, knowledge of things, and experience" (McCrosson's terms). De la Mare hastens to add that this does not make the intellectual's poetry any less good, but it is clear where his own preference lies.

Come Hither
Come Hither is an anthology edited by de la Mare, mostly of poems, but with some prose. It has a frame story and can be read on several levels. It was first published in 1923 and was a success; further editions have followed. It includes a selection of poems by the leading Georgian poets (from de la Mare's perspective).

Supernaturalism
De la Mare was a notable writer of ghost stories. His collections Eight Tales, The Riddle and Other Stories, The Connoisseur and Other Stories, On the Edge and The Wind Blows Over contain several ghost stories each.

De la Mare's supernatural horror writings were favourites of H. P. Lovecraft, who in his classic study Supernatural Horror in Literature remarked that "he is able to put into his occasional fear-studies a keen potency which only a rare master can achieve", especially praising his short stories "Seaton's Aunt", "The Tree", "Out of the Deep", "Mr Kempe", "A Recluse" and "All Hallows", along with his novel The Return. Gary William Crawford has described de la Mare's supernatural fiction for adults as being "among the finest to appear in the first half of this century", whilst noting the disparity between the high quality and low quantity of de la Mare's mature horror stories. Other notable de la Mare ghost/horror stories are "A:B:O", "Crewe", "The Green Room" and "Winter".

Several later writers of supernatural fiction, including Robert Aickman, Ramsey Campbell, David A. McIntee and Reggie Oliver, have cited de la Mare's ghost stories as highly inspirational. The horror scholar S. T. Joshi has said that de la Mare's supernatural fiction "should always have an audience that will shudder apprehensively at its horror and be moved to somber reflection by its pensive philosophy".

For children de la Mare wrote the fairy tale The Three Mulla Mulgars (1910, later retitled The Three Royal Monkeys), praised by the literary historian Julia Briggs as a "neglected masterpiece" and by the critic Brian Stableford as a "classic animal fantasy". Richard Adams said it was his favourite novel.

Joan Aiken cited some of his short stories, such as "The Almond Tree" and "Sambo and the Snow Mountains", for their sometimes unexplained quality, which she also employed in her own work.

De la Mare wrote two supernatural novels, Henry Brocken (1904) and The Return (1910). His poem "The Ghost Chase" appeared in Punch for 26 March 1941 and was illustrated by Rowland Emett.

Works

Novels
Henry Brocken (1904)
The Three Mulla Mulgars (1910) (edition illustrated by Dorothy P. Lathrop [1919]), also published as The Three Royal Monkeys (children's novel)
The Return (1910; revised edition 1922; second revised edition 1945)
Memoirs of a Midget (1921)
Mr Bumps and His Monkey (1942) (illustrated by Dorothy P. Lathrop)

Short story collections
The Riddle and Other Stories (1923): "The Almond Tree", "The Count's Courtship", "The Looking-Glass", "Miss Duveen", "Selina's Parable", "Seaton's Aunt", "The Bird of Travel", "The Bowl", "The Three Friends", "Lispet", "Lispet and Vaine", "The Tree", "Out of the Deep", "The Creatures", "The Riddle", "The Vats" 
Ding Dong Bell (1924): "Lichen", "Benighted", "Strangers and Pilgrims", "Winter"
Broomsticks and Other Tales (1925): "Pigtails, Ltd.", "The Dutch Cheese", "Miss Jemima", "The Thief", "Broomsticks", "Lucy", "A Nose", "The Three Sleeping Boys of Warwickshire", "The Lovely Myfanwy", "Maria-Fly", "Visitors"
The Connoisseur and Other Stories (1926): "Mr Kempe", "Missing", "The Connoisseur". "Disillusioned", "The Nap", "Pretty Poll", "All Hallows", "The Wharf", "The Lost Track" 
On the Edge (1930): "A Recluse", "Willows", "Crewe", "At First Sight", "The Green Room", "The Orgy", "An Idyll", "The Picnic", "An Ideal Craftsman"
The Dutch Cheese (1931) (editions illustrated by Dorothy P. Lathrop [1931] and Irene Hawkins [1947]) (children's stories)
The Lord Fish (1933), illustrated by Rex Whistler (children's stories)
The Walter de la Mare Omnibus (1933)
The Wind Blows Over (1936): "What Dreams May Come", "Cape Race", "Physic", "The Talisman", "In the Forest", "A Froward Child", "Miss Miller", "The House", "A Revenant", "A Nest of Singing-Birds", "The Trumpet"
The Nap and Other Stories (1936)
Stories, Essays and Poems (1938)
The Best Stories of Walter de la Mare (1942)
The Scarecrow and Other Stories (1945)
Collected Stories for Children (1947) (editions illustrated by Irene Hawkins [1947] and Robin Jacques [1957])
A Beginning and Other Stories (1955): "Odd Shop", "Music", "The Stranger", "Neighbours", "The Princess", "The Guardian", "The Face", "The Cartouche", "The Picture", "The Quincunx", "An Anniversary", "Bad Company", "A Beginning"
Eight Tales (1971) 
Walter de la Mare, Short Stories 1895–1926 (1996): Collection comprising the contents of The Riddle and Other Stories, Ding Dong Bell and The Connoisseur and Other Stories, as well as "Kismet", "The Hangman Luck", "A Mote", "The Village of Old Age", "The Moon's Miracle", "The Giant", "De Mortuis", "The Rejection of the Rector", "The Match-Maker", "The Budget", "The Pear-Tree", "Leap Year", "Promise at Dusk", "Two Days in Town"
Walter de la Mare, Short Stories 1927–1956 (2000): Collection comprising the contents of On the Edge, The Wind Blows Over and A Beginning and Other Stories, as well as "The Lynx", "A Sort of Interview", "The Miller's Tale", "A:B:O.", "The Orgy: An Idyll, Part II", "Late", "Pig", "Dr Iggatt"
Walter de la Mare, Short Stories for Children (2006)

Poetry collections
Songs of Childhood (1902)
Poems (1906)
The Listeners (1912)
Peacock Pie (1913) (editions illustrated by W. Heath Robinson [1916], Claud Lovat Fraser [1924], Rowland Emett [1941] and Edward Ardizzone [1946])
The Sunken Garden and Other Poems (1917)
Motley and Other Poems (1918)
The Veil and Other Poems (1921) 
Down-Adown-Derry: A Book of Fairy Poems (1922) (illustrated by Dorothy P. Lathrop)
A Child's Day: A Book of Rhymes (1924) (illustrated by Winifred Bromhall)
Selected Poems by Walter de la Mare (1927, 1931)
Stuff and Nonsense and So On (1927) (editions illustrated by Bold [1927] and Margaret Wolpe [1946])
This Year: Next Year (1937) (illustrated by Harold Jones)
Bells and Grass (1941) (editions illustrated by Rowland Emett [1941] and Dorothy P. Lathrop [1942]) 
Time Passes and Other Poems (1942)
Inward Companion (1950)
O Lovely England (1952)
Walter de la Mare: The Complete Poems, ed. Giles de la Mare (1969)
 Ariel Poems
Six poems were published by Faber and Faber as part of the Ariel Poems, for both series. They were the following:
 Alone (1927)
 Self to Self (1928)
 The Snowdrop (1929)
 News (1930)
 To Lucy (1931)
 The Winnowing Dream (1954)

Plays
Crossings: A Fairy Play (1921) (edition illustrated by Dorothy P. Lathrop (1923))

Nonfiction
Some Women Novelists of the 'Seventies (1929)
Desert Islands and Robinson Crusoe (1930)
Lewis Carroll (1930)
The Early Novels of Wilkie Collins (1932)

Anthologies edited

Come Hither (1923; new and revised edition, 1928; third edition, reset and printed from new plates, 1957)
Tom Tiddler's Ground (1931; named after the children's game)
Early One Morning, in the Spring: Chapters on Children and on Childhood As It Is Revealed in Particular in Early Memories and in Early Writings (1935)
Behold, This Dreamer!: Of Reverie, Night, Sleep, Dream, Love-Dreams, Nightmare, Death, the Unconscious, the Imagination, Divination, the Artist, and Kindred Subjects (1939)
Love (1943)

Legacy

References in books

C. K. Scott Moncrieff, in translating Marcel Proust's seven-volume work Remembrance of Things Past, used the last line of de la Mare's poem "The Ghost" as the title of the sixth volume, The Sweet Cheat Gone (French: Albertine Disparu and La Fugitive).

In 1944 Faber and Faber and one of de la Mare's friends, a certain Dr Bett, arranged to secretly produce a  tribute for his 75th birthday. This publication was a collaborative effort involving many admirers of Walter de la Mare's work, and included individual pieces by a variety of authors, including V. Sackville-West, J. B. Priestly, T. S. Eliot, Siegfried Sassoon, Lord Dunsany, and Henry Williamson.

Richard Adams's debut novel Watership Down (1972) uses several of de la Mare's poems as epigraphs.

De la Mare's play Crossings has an important role in Robertson Davies's novel The Manticore. In 1944, when the protagonist David Staunton is sixteen, de la Mare's play is produced by the pupils of his sister's school in Toronto. Staunton falls deeply in love with the girl playing the main role, a first love that has a profound effect on the rest of his life.

Symposium by Muriel Spark quotes de la Mare's poem "Fare Well": "Look thy last on all things lovely/Every hour.".

References in music

Benjamin Britten set several of de la Mare's verses to music: de la Mare's version of the traditional song "Levy-Dew" in 1934, and five others, which were then collected in Tit for Tat.

Theodore Chanler used texts from de la Mare's story "Benighted" for his song cycle 8 Epitaphs.

See also

 List of horror fiction authors
 The Queen's Book of the Red Cross

Notes

References

Bibliography 
Adrian, Jack, "De la Mare, Walter", in David Pringle (ed), St. James Guide to Horror, Ghost and Gothic Writers. London: St. James Press, 1998. 

McCrosson, Doris Ross (1966). Walter de la Mare. Twayne.
Wagenknecht, Edward, "Walter de la Mare", in Seven Masters of Supernatural Fiction. New York: Greenwood, 1991. .
Whistler, Theresa (1993). Imagination of the Heart:The Life of Walter de la Mare.

Works by de la Mare

External links 

 Walter de la Mare Society Website
 
 
 
 
 
 Walter de la Mare: A Database – a secondary bibliography
 "de La Mare, Walter" in The Encyclopedia of Fantasy  
  — the famous poem recorded as a song (2009), music composed by Bernd Wahlbrinck 
 

1873 births
1956 deaths
English children's writers
20th-century English poets
20th-century English novelists
English short story writers
English fantasy writers
English horror writers
Carnegie Medal in Literature winners
Members of the Order of the Companions of Honour
Members of the Order of Merit
British World War I poets
20th-century English male writers
English people of Scottish descent
Deaths from coronary thrombosis
Ghost story writers
People from Charlton, London
People educated at St. Paul's Cathedral School
Burials at St Paul's Cathedral
James Tait Black Memorial Prize recipients
English male poets
English male short story writers
English male novelists
Children's poets
Weird fiction writers